Roy Welland (born October 2, 1962) is a wine connoisseur and world class bridge player. He plays for Germany and currently lives in Copenhagen, Denmark.

Biography

Early life
Welland was born in Madison, Wisconsin and raised in Evanston, Illinois. His father taught mathematics at Northwestern University. In 1980, he moved to New York to pursue a career on Wall Street and became an options trader. Over time, he became a wine enthusiast and amassed a significant wine collection.

Bridge career
Roy Welland began playing bridge in 1986 when he won the American Contract Bridge League's (ACBL's) Rookie of the Year Award; he went on to win numerous national championships. In 2004, he was on the team chosen by the United States Bridge Federation to represent the country in the World Team Olympiad in Istanbul, Turkey. In March 2007, he won the Mott-Smith Trophy.  Later that year, he won the Player of the Year Award for best performance in the 2007 national events.

Bridge accomplishments

Awards (3)

Wins (10)

Runners-up (6)

References

External links
 
 

People from Madison, Wisconsin
American contract bridge players
German contract bridge players
Living people
1962 births
People from Evanston, Illinois
Sportspeople from New York City